Laurence Niyonsaba (born 14 June 1973) is a Rwandan middle-distance runner. She competed in the women's 1500 metres at the 1992 Summer Olympics.

References

1973 births
Living people
Athletes (track and field) at the 1992 Summer Olympics
Rwandan female middle-distance runners
Olympic athletes of Rwanda
World Athletics Championships athletes for Rwanda
Place of birth missing (living people)